The 2011 World Judo Juniors Championships was an edition of the World Judo Juniors Championships, organised by the International Judo Federation. It was held in Cape Town, South Africa from 3 to 6 November 2011.

Medal summary

Men's events

Women's events

Source Results

Medal table

References

External links
 

World Judo Junior Championships
 U21
World Championships, U21
World Championships, U21
Judo
Judo competitions in South Africa
Judo
Judo, World Championships U21